Phantom Theater was a dark ride located at Kings Island amusement park in Mason, Ohio. The ride was manufactured by Morgan Manufacturing and was similar to Disney's Omnimover ride system, with a continuously moving chain of vehicles. The attraction took guests through a haunted, abandoned theater and was furnished with sets and characters created by R&R Creative Amusement Designs, Inc. The ride replaced Smurf's Enchanted Voyage (1984-1991), which in turn was a re-skin of the original Enchanted Voyage (1972-1983). The ride was re-themed to Scooby-Doo and the Haunted Castle in 2003, and again to Boo Blasters on Boo Hill in 2010. The ride system remains in place, albeit with modifications.

History
Taft Broadcasting, interested in finding a way to promote its recently-acquired Hanna-Barbera division, met with Gary Wachs and his father Ralph, both of whom owned Cincinnati's Coney Island and were intent on expanding and moving the park, for a possible merger. The business purchased the land in 1969. Construction of Kings Island began in 1970, and the most expensive attraction erected for the park's inaugural year was a dark ride called Enchanted Voyage, which cost approximately $2 million to construct. The ride was manufactured by Arrow Development and opened with the park in 1972.

Enchanted Voyage was located in a building shaped like a giant TV set, taking guests through several rooms featuring animatronic versions of new and old Hanna-Barbera characters. Its theme song was composed by well-known Hanna-Barbera music producer Paul De Korte, and the lyrics were written by William Hanna and former Coney Island executive Dennis Speigel. It played throughout the ride, reciting themes from familiar characters such as Fred Flintstone, Scooby-Doo, and Yogi Bear. Less common shows such as Wacky Races and The Banana Splits were also alluded to. The first room introduced the song while the second room changed to a western accent, the third utilized a Caribbean flavor and the fourth had a "spooky" theme. The fifth and final room reverted to the original music with a circus-like ambiance. The rides final exit was at the "mouth" of a giant clown as each boat would travel a few feet up an inclined lift hill before splashing down the drop into the water on the other side.

Smurf's Enchanted Voyage (1984-1991)
For the 1984 season, Kings Island updated the ride's theme to Hanna-Barbera's The Smurfs, and it was renamed Smurf's Enchanted Voyage. New animatronics were used for various characters and decorations, and the song playing throughout the ride was changed to coincide with the cartoon. Smurf's Enchanted Voyage consisted of several rooms, each themed to a different season of the year focusing on holidays such as Christmas and Halloween.

Phantom Theater (1992–2002)
At the end of the 1991 season, the building housing the attraction was gutted and the water transportation system was removed. Installed in its place was an Omnimover-type dark ride similar in style to The Haunted Mansion attractions at various Disney parks around the world. The original loading area for the boats entering and exiting the ride was converted a line queue area for a children's kiddie roller coaster originally named Scooby Zoom and later known as Great Pumpkin Coaster. A new entrance was constructed for Phantom Theater at the opposite corner of the building. A small, unused section of the building was converted into a children's theater called "Enchanted Theater".

Phantom Theater was themed to a behind-the-scenes tour of a theater haunted by the dead. The exterior of the building was stylized as a dilapidated and crumbling opera theater. The queue area featured low lighting and walls that were decorated with busts and portraits of some of the ghosts that would be seen during the ride, with eyes that would seem to follow the riders as they walked past them. The ride itself featured seventeen separate scenes which the Omnimover-like vehicles slowly traversed through. The ride notably featured a Pepper's ghost trick, a famous and widely used dark ride trick, for its stage production scene.

Kings Island previously displayed a number of the Phantom Theater  vehicles that were removed in 2002 as Halloween displays during the park's Halloween Haunt. They were removed from storage each year and placed on the International Bandstand at the base of the Eiffel Tower.

Removal
Phantom Theater closed in July 2002. Almost all thematic elements were removed and replaced with new scenes created by Sally Dark Rides. 28 of the 55 ride vehicles were also removed, while the remaining were retrofitted with laser light guns that riders would use to point and shoot at various targets throughout the ride. The attraction reopened in 2003 as Scooby-Doo and the Haunted Castle. In 2010, Cedar Fair opted to not renew the license for Scooby-Doo and Mystery, Inc. The ride was renamed Boo Blasters on Boo Hill and was slightly altered to feature a new story line.

Following Phantom Theater's removal, leftover ride components have served as props during the park's annual Halloween Haunt event. The furnace from the ride appears in Slaughterhouse, and the sarcophagus and cannon appear in Madame Fatale's Cavern of Terror. Ride vehicles and characters have occasionally been displayed as well in various areas across the park.

See also
Scooby-Doo and the Haunted Castle
Boo Blasters on Boo Hill

References

External links
Kings Island official page

Omnimover attractions
Amusement rides introduced in 1992
Animatronic attractions
Amusement rides manufactured by D. H. Morgan Manufacturing
Cedar Fair attractions
The Smurfs in amusement parks
1972 establishments in Ohio
2002 disestablishments in Ohio